Mary Alice Monroe is a best-selling author known for fiction that explore the compelling parallels between nature and human nature. Many of her novels deal with environmental issues. For example, The Beach House and Swimming Lessons refer to the plight of injured sea turtles.

Monroe currently resides in South Carolina, and many of her novels are set in the southern United States and feature "strong Southern women".

Her novel Time Is a River is about breast cancer survivors in a fly-fishing group in North Carolina, and Last Light Over Carolina describes the life and times of the shrimping industry.

Monroe has received numerous awards, including the 2008 Award for Writing from the South Carolina Center for the Book, 2014 South Carolina Award for Literary Excellence, 2015 SW Florida Author of Distinction Award, the RT Lifetime Achievement Award, the International Book Award for Green Fiction. Mary Alice Monroe is a 2018 inductee to the South Carolina Academy of Authors.

Bibliography

This is a full list of novels from the author's website.

Adaptations
The Beach House (2002) was adapted as the TV movie The Beach House (2018) by the Hallmark Channel.

References

External links

 Official Website

Living people
Year of birth missing (living people)
21st-century American novelists
American women novelists
21st-century American women writers